Utobium is a genus of death-watch and spider beetles in the family Ptinidae. There are at least four described species in Utobium.

Species
These four species belong to the genus Utobium:
 Utobium elegans (Horn, 1894)
 Utobium granulatum White, 1976
 Utobium griseum White, 1966
 Utobium marmoratum Fisher, 1939

References

Further reading

 
 
 
 

Bostrichoidea
Articles created by Qbugbot